General Holmes Drive is a  major divided road located in Sydney, New South Wales, Australia. The road forms part of the M1, the A1, the Sydney Orbital Network, and the Australian Highway 1 network.

The road forms major links with the Southern Cross Drive and the M5 East, both part of the Sydney Orbital Network.

The road is named in honour of William Holmes, a distinguished Australian general who died in action during World War I.

Route
General Holmes Drive starts from Joyce Drive in Mascot, and heads south, reaching a major intersection with Wentworth Drive that carries all traffic exiting from the domestic terminals at Sydney Airport.

General Holmes Drive then heads through the Sydney Airport Tunnel, an eight-lane tidal flow culvert under the south-eastern runways of Sydney Airport. As the road exits the tunnel, there is a major exit to the M5.

Traffic runs in three lanes in both directions through Kyeemagh, becoming four lanes after the M5 East junction. The M5 East can only be accessed southbound, and traffic joins General Holmes Drive northbound.

Several major billboards are situated towards the northeastern terminus of the General Holmes Drive.

Until July 2019, General Holmes Drive continued for a further  to the north-east to an intersection with Botany Road crossing the Metropolitan Goods railway line via a level crossing. This section closed when the level crossing was replaced by an underpass at Wentworth Avenue.

Exits and interchanges

See also 

 Freeways in Australia
 Freeways in Sydney

References

External links 

Roads & Maritime Services Webcam

Streets in Sydney
Highway 1 (Australia)